The 2016 Campeonato Nacional de Fútbol de Cuba was the 105th season of the competition. The season began on 6 February 2016 and concluded on 18 June 2016. The league was won by Villa Clara, who claimed their 14th Cuban league title, and their first since 2013. Villa Clara and runners-up, Guantánamo earned berths into the 2017 CFU Club Championship as league winners and runners-up, however, it does not necessarily mean they will participate.

Table

References 

Campeonato Nacional de Fútbol de Cuba seasons
Cuba
Cuba
football